The Claiming Crown, inaugurated in 1999, is a series of eight races run under starter allowance conditions with purses ranging from $100,000 to $175,000. The National Horsemen’s Benevolent and Protective Association (National HBPA) and Thoroughbred Owners and Breeders Association (TOBA) together launched this event in cooperation with the Minnesota HBPA and Canterbury Park. 

It is seen as a "blue collar” Breeders' Cup series for claiming horses. Any claiming horse owner can participate subject to stipulated conditions.

The Claiming Crown, held under the auspices of the National HBPA and TOBA , was held at Canterbury Park in Shakopee, Minnesota for 10 of its first 12 years of existence. The track last held the event in 2010. 

In 2002, the Claiming Crown was held at Philadelphia Park Racetrack; in 2007, it took place at Ellis Park Racecourse; and in 2011 it was held at Fair Grounds. 

In 2012, the Claiming Crown moved to Gulfstream Park, where is remained for 10 years. To honor these horses, which the industry calls the "backbone of racing", Gulfstream raised the total purses to $850,000. The following year, total purses hit $1 million for the first time. Gulfstream set several handle records, including the all-time record handle of $14,611,500 set in 2020. During its run at Gulfstream, the names of two races were changed to honor the late Tom Metzen and Kent Stirling, who both made significant contributions to ensure the success of the Claiming Crown.

The 2022 Claiming Crown is set to be held on November 12 at Churchill Downs, marking the first time the event will be held at the home of the Kentucky Derby.

The Eight Races

References

External links
 The Claiming Crown’s Official Site
 Thoroughbred Owners and Breeders Association

Horse races in the United States
Racing series for horses
Recurring sporting events established in 1999
1999 establishments in Minnesota